Daya Singh Sodhi (1 February 1925 – 15 July 2011) was an Indian politician from Amritsar, a city of Punjab and a member of Bharatiya Janata Party. He was born on  1 February 1925 at Butala village of Amritsar district. In 1991 he was elected for Amritsar Municipal Corporation and In 1998 he was elected for the Amritsar Lok Sabha seat as BJP candidate. Singh Sodhi died from cardiac arrest on 15 July 2011, at the age of 86.

References

1925 births
2011 deaths
India MPs 1998–1999
Bharatiya Janata Party politicians from Punjab
Lok Sabha members from Punjab, India
People from Amritsar district